The Gist is an American daily news podcast hosted by Mike Pesca. The show was originally produced by Slate magazine starting in May 2014 and was suspended by Slate on February 22, 2021.  A year later, Pesca relaunched the podcast under his independent production company, Peach Fish Productions.

Podcast
The show typically starts with a short solo discussion by Pesca of an issue in the news, continues with an interview with an expert or author, and concludes with a "spiel", which is a short op-ed by Pesca on some topic that may or may not have already been discussed in the podcast.  Beyond issues of current events and politics, a notable focus of the Gist is on the quality of arguments and use of wordplay.

New episodes of the show are released afternoons daily during the week.

The Gist'''s average rating is 4.6 out of 5 on Apple Podcasts.

Controversy
Slate suspended Pesca and The Gist following a debate between Pesca and other Slate staff over a controversy involving journalist Donald G. McNeil.  McNeil said the n-word “in the context of a conversation about racist language" during a New York Times's sponsored trip with students.  Pesca opined that McNeil's conduct should not result in him being fired. 

In early September 2021, the Washington Post'' reported that Pesca and Slate had “mutually agreed to part ways … As part of the arrangement, Pesca will take his podcast, “The Gist,” to an independent platform.”

See also
List of daily news podcasts
Political podcast

References

External links 

Audio podcasts
2014 podcast debuts
Megaphone (podcasting)
News podcasts
Political podcasts
American podcasts